Lancaster Trust Company is a historic bank building located at Lancaster, Lancaster County, Pennsylvania. It was designed in 1910 by C. Emlen Urban, and built in 1911–1912, in the Beaux-Arts style. It was added to the front of an existing five-story building, built 1889–1890. It consists of the Main Banking Room, Board Room, and vaults, with the basement, lavatories, and passageways include. The facade is of red brick on a limestone foundation. The bank failed in 1932, and the building remained vacant for the next 50 years.

It was added to the National Register of Historic Places in 1983. For several years the building hosted the Lancaster Quilt and Textile Museum, which featured late 19th–20th century Amish quilts indigenous to the area.

The Trust Performing Arts Center
In 2013, the building became the home of The Trust Performing Arts Center, which is run by Lancaster Bible College's Worship & Performing Arts department. The college puts on a variety of community concerts, lectures, art shows, and live theatre productions at the building.

References

External links
 Lancaster Quilt and Textile Museum website
 The Trust Performing Arts Center website

Bank buildings on the National Register of Historic Places in Pennsylvania
Beaux-Arts architecture in Pennsylvania
Commercial buildings completed in 1912
Buildings and structures in Lancaster, Pennsylvania
1912 establishments in Pennsylvania
National Register of Historic Places in Lancaster, Pennsylvania